The Vanessa Show is a British chat show presented by Vanessa Feltz which was broadcast on BBC One from January to July 1999. It was cancelled following a scandal revealed by the Daily Mirror newspaper, in which the programme was found to have used paid actors as guests.

Background
Feltz previously presented the ITV daytime television chat show Vanessa from 1994 to 1998, before moving to the BBC in a deal believed to be worth between £1 million and around £2 million.

Scandal and cancellation
In February 1999, one month after the show's premiere, it was reported by the Daily Mirror that at least three guests on the programme were actors recruited from an entertainment agency, and that their personal lives discussed on the show were fabricated. The programme's ratings declined as a result, and the BBC shortened it from 90 minutes to 75, then 45. On 9 June, BBC One Controller Peter Salmon announced that the show had been cancelled. The final episodes were broadcast in the July.

References

External links 
 

1999 British television series debuts
1999 British television series endings
1999 controversies
1990s British television talk shows
BBC controversies
BBC television talk shows
BBC Television shows